4930 Hagley Hall is a Great Western Railway, 4-6-0 Hall class locomotive, built in May 1929 at Swindon Works to a design by Charles Collett. It is one of eleven of this class that made it into preservation. The locomotive is named after Hagley Hall in Worcestershire.

Operation
Its first shed allocation was Wolverhampton Stafford Road. After moving around the midland and southern sections of the western region it was withdrawn in December 1963, having covered the impressive total of 1,295,236 miles, eventually being sold for scrap to Woodham Brothers scrapyard in Barry, Vale of Glamorgan, South Wales, arriving in June 1964.

Preservation
Sold to the Severn Valley Railway in June 1972, it became the 29th departure from Barry arriving at Bridgnorth in January 1973. It was eventually restored to working condition in 1979, and ran back on the mainline reaching as far south as Plymouth and north to Chester.  4930 hauled the official re-opening train into Kidderminster Town station in 1984.

4930 was also one of the regular locomotives used on the mainline in 1985 during the 150th anniversary of the Great Western Railway alongside 3440 City of Truro, 5051 Drysllwyn Castle, 6000 King George V, 7029 Clun Castle, 7819 Hinton Manor, 75069 & 92220 Evening Star. During one occasion on 7 April 1985 it travelled overnight from the Severn Valley Railway to Plymouth where it replaced 6000 King George V after it was failed in Taunton with a hotbox while working a railtour from Bristol to Plymouth while double heading with fellow SVR resident 7819 Hinton Manor (7819 while working the same trip was later failed in Exeter with a hotbox). The day later 8 April 4930 would then double head a trip back from Plymouth with a repaired 7819.

4930 Was a regular mainline performer from 1979 to 1986 when the engine was withdrawn from service & worked a total of 21 railtours either solo or double heading with other engines including fellow SVR residents 5000, 6960 Raveningham Hall, 7812 Erlestoke Manor & 7819 Hinton Manor.

After its withdrawal in 1986 pending overhaul, it was loaned in 1999 to the Macarthur Glen shopping centre in Swindon as a static exhibit. In June 2007 it was returned to the Severn Valley Railway intending to take its place in the new 'Engine House' outside Highley railway station. After a delay due to the floods that hit the railway in June 2007, the Engine House opened in March 2008 when Hagley Hall was placed on show.

Return to Steam
In October 2013, 4930 was moved from the Engine house to Bridgnorth so that the overhaul could begin. The overhaul is being supported by the SVR Charitable Trust and the Friends of Locomotive Hagley Hall Group. Some of the money for the overhaul was raised by members of the public who subscribed to the SVR's share offer scheme, which included the objectives of restoring 4930 and some matching Great Western coaches. 4930's departure from Highley allowed LMS Stanier Black 5 4-6-0 45110 to take its place. 4930 has swapped its Hawksworth tender for Witherslack Hall's Collett tender. Running in following the overhaul commenced on 23 June 2022.

Following the export of classmate 4920 Dumbleton Hall to Tokyo, Japan in December 2021, on completion of its overhaul and return to service 4930 is presently the oldest Hall operating and oldest based in the UK.

Allocations

Popular culture
The engine features in the 1986 documentary "Steam Days" with Miles Kington on a run out from Bristol to Plymouth with fellow GWR engine Drysllwyn Castle during the 150th Anniversary of the GWR in 1985.

4930 also featured running passenger trains on the SVR In the 1986 programme The Great Western Experience alongside other GWR locomotives, such as 5764, 5051 Drysllwyn Castle, 6998 Burton Agnes Hall and 7029 Clun Castle.

References

External links
Friends of 4930 Hagley Hall
Severn Valley Railway Charitable Trust 4930 page

4930
Railway locomotives introduced in 1929
4930
Locomotives saved from Woodham Brothers scrapyard
Standard gauge steam locomotives of Great Britain
4-6-0 locomotives
Severn Valley Railway